Vishwanathganj is a town in Pratapgarh district of the Indian state of Uttar Pradesh. It is an assembly constituency in Pratapgarh affiliated to Uttar Pradesh Vidhan Sabha.

Geography
Bakulahi river also flows here.

Tourism

Shani Dev Temple 

Shani Dev Dham, the temple dedicated to Shani Dev, is located at a distance of about 51 km from Allahabad, 16 km from Pratapgarh, 116 km from Ayodhya, & 3 km from Vishwanathganj in Kushfara village. Hanuman and Manokamana temples are also situated in the same premises. Every Saturday people throng in large numbers & perform special worship here. Navratri is also celebrated here. On the third day of Kartik month a Rathyatra is also organized here.

Election synopsis 
Vishwanathganj is one of the Vidhan Sabha of Pratapgarh. Raja Ram Pandey  is current Member of Legislative Assembly from the constituency.

Transport 
Viswanathganj is its own railway station. It belongs to Northern Railway, Lucknow . Neighbourhood stations are Dhirganj, Near By major railway station is Pratapgarh,  Phaphamau and  Prayagraj_Railway_Station and Airport is Bamrauli Airport.

References

External links
 Vishwanathganj on Google Map

Cities and towns in Pratapgarh district, Uttar Pradesh